The 2009 Camparini Gioielli Cup was a professional tennis tournament played on outdoor red clay courts. It was part of the 2009 ATP Challenger Tour. It took place in Reggio Emilia, Italy between 22 and 28 June 2009.

Singles entrants

Seeds

 Rankings are as of June 15, 2009.

Other entrants
The following players received wildcards into the singles main draw:
  Daniele Bracciali
  Matteo Trevisan
  Simone Vagnozzi
  Mariano Zabaleta

The following players received entry from the qualifying draw:
  Alberto Brizzi
  Thomas Fabbiano
  Guillermo Hormazabál
  Gianluca Naso

The following player received special exempt into the main draw:
  Pavol Červenák
  Nicolás Todero

Champions

Singles

 Paolo Lorenzi def.  Jean-René Lisnard, 7–5, 1–6, 6–2

Doubles

 Miguel Ángel López Jaén /  Pere Riba def.  Gianluca Naso /  Walter Trusendi, 6–4, 6–4

References
Official website
ITF search 
2009 Draws

Camparini Gioielli Cup
Clay court tennis tournaments
Camparini Gioielli Cup
2009 in Italian tennis